Vilhelm Emanuel Jakob Gylche (6 January 1888 – 18 December 1952) was a Danish  track and field athlete who competed in the 1912 Summer Olympics. He is the brother of Karl Paul Kristian Gylche.

He was born in Copenhagen and died in Gentofte.

In 1912 he qualified for the final of the 10 kilometre walk event, but did not finish the race.

References

External links

1888 births
1952 deaths
Danish male racewalkers
Olympic athletes of Denmark
Athletes (track and field) at the 1912 Summer Olympics
Athletes from Copenhagen